Michael Ricketts (born 1978) is an English former footballer.

Michael Ricketts may also refer to:
 Michael Ricketts (musician) (born 1965), American musician
 Michael Ricketts (football administrator), Jamaican football administrator
 Michael Ricketts (cricketer) (1923–2004), English cricketer